Robert Lawrence Chisholm (born August 31, 1957 in Kentville, Nova Scotia) is a former trade unionist and politician from Nova Scotia, Canada. He represented the Halifax Atlantic riding in the Nova Scotia House of Assembly from 1991 to 2003. He succeeded Alexa McDonough as leader of the Nova Scotia New Democratic Party (NDP) in 1996. He served as the leader of the Official Opposition in the Nova Scotia Legislature from 1998 to 1999. He subsequently founded a consulting firm, was co-chair of the 2010–11 United Way of Halifax Region campaign, and sat on the Board of Governors of Dalhousie University. On May 2, 2011, Chisholm was elected as the Member of Parliament for the Dartmouth—Cole Harbour riding in Nova Scotia. As a member of the Official Opposition, he served as the Critic for Fisheries and Oceans and Deputy Critic for Employment Insurance until his defeat in the 2015 election.

Provincial politics

1998 Nova Scotia general election

The NDP scored a surprise electoral success in the  1997 federal election, winning six of Nova Scotia's eleven electoral districts. This new-found electoral success boded well for the NDP's provincial party, which was able to take advantage of the new wave of popularity. Prior to 1997, the Nova Scotia NDP had not been considered contenders to form a provincial government.

Chisholm subsequently lead the NDP to a record 19 seats (out of the House of Assembly's 52 seats) in the 1998 provincial election, putting them in a tie with the governing Liberal Party.  The Liberals were able to continue ruling, as they received support from the third-place Progressive Conservatives, who held 14 seats. The NDP formed the Official Opposition, marking the first time they attained that position; the Co-operative Commonwealth Federation (CCF), were the last democratic socialist party to hold that title, back in 1949.

1999 Nova Scotia election
15 months later, the Liberal government was defeated by a motion of non-confidence from the Conservatives, forcing an election in the summer of 1999. During the campaign, it was revealed that Chisholm had a past criminal record for driving under the influence of alcohol when he was 19 years old.  The NDP lost eight seats during the campaign, which saw the third-place Conservatives elected to a majority government.  During this period, the NDP shared official opposition status with the Liberals (as both held 11 seats). The NDP became sole official opposition upon Russell MacLellan's resignation, and the subsequent election of Progressive Conservative Cecil Clark, which gave the NDP 11 seats to the Liberals' 10.

Chisholm unexpectedly resigned the leadership after the campaign, at the November 6, 1999 NSNDP provincial council meeting. He said that he wanted to spend more time with his family and could not subject them to ten more years of political life.  He remained sitting as an MLA in the Legislature and remained as leader until a new one was elected.  He was succeeded by Helen MacDonald in 2000; and after she could not win a seat in the house, Darrell Dexter eventually became the leader in 2001. Chisholm did not run for re-election as an MLA in 2003 provincial election.

Private life

After the 2003 provincial election, Chisholm returned to the labour movement and worked as researcher for the Canadian Union of Public Employees (CUPE). Since 2004, he has been a member of Dalhousie University's board of governors.
  In 2007, he became CUPE's Regional Director for the Atlantic Region.    In the spring of 2009, he started a consulting firm with his wife Paula Simon: Simon Chisholm Consulting.

Return to politics
On January 18, 2011, Chisholm announced that he would seek the New Democratic Party nomination in Dartmouth—Cole Harbour for the 2011 federal election,  and was officially nominated on January 25. On May 2, 2011, he was elected, winning 15,661 votes and defeating Liberal Party of Canada incumbent Mike Savage.

Following the death of federal NDP leader Jack Layton, Chisholm was a candidate in the 2012 New Democratic Party leadership election, but after speaking English during a leadership debate in French on account of his lack of fluency in the latter language, he withdrew in December 2011 and subsequently endorsed Thomas Mulcair.

In the 2015 federal election, Chisholm was defeated by Liberal Darren Fisher.

Electoral history

References

External links
 
 

1957 births
Living people
Nova Scotia New Democratic Party MLAs
Leaders of the Nova Scotia CCF/NDP
New Democratic Party MPs
Members of the House of Commons of Canada from Nova Scotia
Carleton University alumni
Dalhousie University alumni
21st-century Canadian politicians
People from Kentville, Nova Scotia